Bhagya Debata ( God of destiny) is a 1995 Indian Bengali-language film directed by Raghuram, a dance choreographer in South Indian cinema, starring Mithun Chakraborty, Soham Chakraborty, Soumitra Chatterjee, Mamta Kulkarni, Rituparna Sengupta and Puneet Issar. Tamil film actor Rajinikanth made a special appearance in the film.

Plot
The film is an action drama of revenge and vengeance. The protagonist Jagadish Mondal appears like a Robin Hood character, always there to help the poor. In normal life he is a common man having a wife but against the corruption and crime he becomes Alfred.

Cast
Mithun Chakraborty as Jagadish/Alfred (dual role)
Soham Chakraborty
Rajinikanth 
Soumitra Chatterjee 
Mamta Kulkarni 
Puneet Issar 
Rituparna Sengupta as Sabitri

Soundtrack
"Awaz Do Phir" Mohammed Aziz
"Bhagya Devta" Mohammed Aziz

References

External links
krantikari Organisation
 

1995 films
Bengali-language Indian films
Mithun's Dream Factory films
Films shot in Ooty
Indian films about revenge
Indian vigilante films
Indian action films
1990s Bengali-language films
1995 action films
1990s vigilante films